Kobylinka may refer to:
Kobylinka, Ryazan Oblast, a village in Ryazan Oblast, Russia
Kobylinka, Tula Oblast, a village in Tula Oblast, Russia